Karen Peterson may refer to:

Karen Peterson (animator)
Karen E. Peterson, a state legislator in Delaware
Karen Carter Peterson, a state legislator in Louisiana
Karen M. Peterson, a state legislator in Utah